Marlon Manalo (born November 27, 1975, in Mandaluyong, Philippines) is a former Filipino professional pool player from Mandaluyong, Philippines. He became the League of Barangays of the Philippines Press Relation Officer and ABC president.

Career
Originally a snooker player, Manalo has represented the Philippines a number of times in the Asian Games and Southeast Asian Games. In the 2001 World Games, Manalo won the silver medal in the snooker event, placing second to Bjorn Haneveer of Belgium.

His professional debut in pool was the Tirador Nine-ball Tournament in Manila in 2003. He reached the final, but eventually lost to Warren Kiamco. Weeks later, he competed in the Tirador Ten-ball Tournament. Again, he made it to the final, but lost to Ramil Gallego. The first pool tournament he won in the Philippines was the Corporate Billiards League, a tournament where a team of three players plays against another three. All the players were local but Marcus Chamat, a pool specialist from Sweden, was in contention.

Predominantly a snooker player in a country with just four tables, Manalo is nicknamed "Marvelous." He defeated Yang Ching-shun, Francisco Bustamante and Efren Reyes in successive matches at the 2004 WPC before losing in the last eight to Marcus Chamat.

Manalo nearly won his first world title at the 2004 WPA World Eight-ball Championship, but lost to his compatriot, Efren Reyes.

Manalo won a number of tournaments in the United States in 2005, including the short-lived Texas Hold'em Billiards Championship where he earned the $100,000 winner-take-all purse, and the 2005 New Jersey Straight Pool Open. In 2006, he could have been one of the first Philippine players, along with Dennis Orcollo, to compete in the World Straight Pool Championship but withdrew to compete in another tournament in Bangkok, Thailand. That same year, he made it to the final of the IPT North American Eight-ball Open Championship. He was defeated, however, by Thorsten Hohmann who won the $350,000 first prize. Manalo received $99,000.

After he was runner-up in the 2007 Philippine National Championships to Lee Van Corteza, Manalo won the title against Antonio Gabica a year later.

Achievements
 2008 Philippine National Championship
 2007 Southeast Asian Games Nine-ball Doubles
 2007 Seminole Florida Pro Tour Stop
 2005 Texas Hold Em Billiards Championship
 2005 NJ 14.1 Championship
 2005 Hard Times 9-ball Championship
 2005 Sands Regency 9-Ball Open
 2003 Corporate Billiards League
 2000 ACBS Asian Snooker Championship
 1995 Southeast Asian Games Nine-ball Doubles
 1991 Southeast Asian Games Nine-ball Team

References

External links
 https://web.archive.org/web/20060825170510/http://azbilliards.com/thepros/2000showplayer2005.cfm?playernum=2555
 https://web.archive.org/web/20060825071539/http://www.billiardster.com/players/marlonmanalo/

Filipino pool players
Living people
1975 births
People from Mandaluyong
Sportspeople from Metro Manila
Cue sports players at the 2010 Asian Games
Cue sports players at the 2002 Asian Games
World Games silver medalists
Competitors at the 2001 World Games
Southeast Asian Games gold medalists for the Philippines
Southeast Asian Games medalists in cue sports
Cue sports players at the 1998 Asian Games
Competitors at the 2007 Southeast Asian Games
Asian Games competitors for the Philippines